Patissa tonkinialis is a moth in the family Crambidae. It was described by Aristide Caradja in 1926. It is found in Vietnam.

References

Moths described in 1926
Schoenobiinae